Željko Pervan (born 7 August 1962) is a Croatian comedian. He is best known as the creator and actor in the comedy show Evening School (Croatian: Večernja Škola)

Life and career
Pervan was born in Zagreb, and started his career in Radio 101 in 1985. Together with Vinko Grubišić, Goran Pirš, Zlatan Zuhrić and Davor Pocrnić, he founded the comedy group Naughty Children which was notorious for its black uncensored humour. In 1995 Pervan, together with Mladen Horvat, Zlatan Zuhrić, Đuro Utješanović and Ahmed Al Rahim, started Večernja škola, a live comedy television show.

Sources

External links

Zločesta Djeca - Serbus Zagreb (1989) 
Večernja Škola - Bajke (1996) 

1962 births
Living people
Male actors from Zagreb
Croatian comedians